{{Infobox animanga/Header
| name = Don't Hurt Me, My Healer!
| image = Kono Healer, Mendokusai volume 1 cover.jpg
| caption = Cover of the first tankōbon volume
| ja_kanji = このヒーラー、めんどくさい
| ja_romaji = Kono Hīrā, Mendokusai
| genre = Fantasy comedy
}}

 is a Japanese fantasy comedy manga series by Tannen ni Hakkō. It has been serialized online via Kadokawa's ComicWalker website since July 2019 and has been collected in six tankōbon volumes. An anime television series adaptation by Jumondou aired from April to June 2022.

Plot
In a fantasy world full of adventuring warriors battling monsters and villains, the heroes and their party members are usually supported by a healer. Alvin, a fully-armored adventurer trying to make a name for himself, meets a dark elf named Carla on his journey who claims to be a healer. However, her spells and her attitude seem to cause him more harm than good, and after she "accidentally" hits Alvin with a curse, the two are forced to travel together.

Characters

A dark elf who claims to be a priestess and even wears the clothes of one, but most of her spells and actions seem to involve dark magic or curses, and she even physically breaks down locked doors with a Bajiquan shoulder strike. However, she does seem to know unorthodox healing magic, saving Alvin or others in dire situations. After "accidentally" hitting Alvin with a curse during their first time meeting, she claims that the two of them will die if they are ever physically too far apart from each other, forcing them to travel together.

A fully-armored warrior whose face is never shown, often hidden behind the faceplate of his helmet or some other object. Surprisingly weak, he claims he can only battle up to the strength of a few slimes at once, and even the aptitude test form at his Adventurer's Guild hall makes fun of his weakness. Most of his journey involves playing the tsukkomi to Carla's boke.
 / 

A sentient mushroom that Carla and Alvin encounter on their quest.

The first enemy Alvin encounters. After being beaten by her, Mostly Bear allows Alvin and Carla to stay in her cabin until Alvin recovers.

The "boss" of the Beginners' Dungeon, Cow is less interested in fighting and more in making a fun obstacle course for amateur adventurers.

A kind-hearted necromancer who seeks to help her dead sister's spirit pass on. In contrast to Carla, she acts and sounds like more of a healer despite using dark magic.

Media
MangaDon't Hurt Me, My Healer! is written and illustrated by Tannen ni Hakkō. It began serialization in Kadokawa's ComicWalker website on July 31, 2019. It also began serialization in Media Factory's seinen manga magazine Monthly Comic Flapper on October 5, 2020. Kadokawa Shoten published the series' first two volumes in print between February and September 2020 and it then switched to Media Factory from the third volume, published in April 2021, on. As of April 2022, five tankōbon'' volumes have been released.

Volumes

Anime
In April 2021, an anime television series adaptation was announced by Kadokawa. It is produced by Jumondou and directed by Nobuaki Nakanishi, with Fumihiko Shimo handling the series' scripts, Chisato Kikunaga designing the characters, and Satoshi Igarashi composing the music. It aired from April 10 to June 26 2022, on AT-X, Tokyo MX, Kansai TV, and BS11. The opening theme song is "Jellyfish na Kimi e" (ジェリーフィッシュな君へ, lit. To the Jellyfish-like You) by Aguri Ōnishi, while the ending theme song is "HERO in HEALER" by Ōnishi, Takuya Satō, and Asuna Tomari. Crunchyroll (formerly known as Funimation) has licensed the series.

Episode list

References

External links
  
  
 

2022 anime television series debuts
Anime series based on manga
Comedy anime and manga
Crunchyroll anime
Japanese webcomics
Kadokawa Dwango franchises
Kadokawa Shoten manga
Media Factory manga
Medialink
Seinen manga
Webcomics in print